The 1998 Cerveza Club Colombia Open was a men's tennis tournament played on Clay in Bogotá, Colombia that was part of the International Series of the 1998 ATP Tour. It was the fifth edition of the tournament and was held from 2 November – 8 November.

Seeds
Champion seeds are indicated in bold text while text in italics indicates the round in which those seeds were eliminated.

Draw

Finals

References

Cerveza Club Colombia Open
Bancolombia Open